Bukhar-Zhyrau District is a district of Karaganda Region in central Kazakhstan. The administrative center of the district is the settlement of Botakara. Population:

Geography
Bukhar-Zhyrau District lies in the Kazakh Uplands.  high mount Semizbughy is the highest point in the district. Rudnichnoye lake is located near it.

References

Districts of Kazakhstan
Karaganda Region